Blas Agustin Romero (born 2 February 1966) is a retired football (soccer) forward from Paraguay.

Career
Romero played professional football in Paraguay, Argentina and Colombia during his career. His last club was Once Caldas. Romero played for Argentina first division side Club Atlético Belgrano.

Romero made his international debut for the Paraguay national football team on 14 June 1991 in a Copa Paz de Chaco match against Bolivia (0-1 win). He obtained a total number of two international caps, scoring no goals for the national side.

References

External links
 Blas Romero at BDFA.com.ar 
 Profile at En una Baldosa 

1966 births
Living people
Paraguayan footballers
Paraguayan expatriate footballers
Paraguay international footballers
Association football forwards
1991 Copa América players
Club Libertad footballers
Once Caldas footballers
Deportes Concepción (Chile) footballers
Club Atlético Belgrano footballers
Paraguayan Primera División players
Categoría Primera A players
Expatriate footballers in Argentina
Expatriate footballers in Chile
Expatriate footballers in Colombia